Canoeing at the 2011 Southeast Asian Games took place at Cipule Regatta Course, Karawang, Karawang Regency of West Java. It was the second sport to be played at the 26th SEA Games after football; however, it was the first sport in which gold medal was awarded in that edition of SEA Games. The first gold medal of this SEAG edition was awarded to Wichan Jaitieng of Thailand.

Medal table

Medal summary

Men

Women

References

External links 
 Official Result

2011 Southeast Asian Games events
Southeast Asian Games
Canoeing and kayaking competitions in Indonesia